Hitoshi Morishita may refer to:

, Japanese footballer and manager
, Japanese footballer